Newport FYN railway station was a railway station at Newport, Isle of Wight, off the south coast of England. For ten years it was the alternative terminus of the Freshwater, Yarmouth and Newport Railway.

History
The station opened on 1 July 1913 after a conflict between the FYN and the Isle of Wight Central Railway, and closed 10 years later on the creation of the Southern, when Freshwater trains reverted to using Newport's main station. During its inauspicious existence passengers had a short inconvenient walk between the two rival termini. Any trace of the station has long since gone.

Stationmaster
William Oliver Bennett, the station master at Ningwood, was appointed in 1913 and stayed in post until 1924 when he transferred to Littleham.

Notes

See also 
 List of closed railway stations in Britain

References

External links 
 Newport's stations on navigable 1946 O. S. map
  Pre 1914 Grouping Junction diagram
 Newport station Subterranea Britannica
 Carriages to be restored
 Site of Station

Disused railway stations on the Isle of Wight
Former Freshwater, Yarmouth and Newport Railway stations
Railway stations in Great Britain opened in 1913
Railway stations in Great Britain closed in 1914
Railway stations in Great Britain opened in 1923
Railway stations in Great Britain closed in 1923
Newport, Isle of Wight
1913 establishments in England
1923 disestablishments in England